Arnaldo Andrés Espínola Benítez (born 5 March 1975), known as Arnaldo Espínola, is a former Paraguayan footballer. He also played for clubs from Brazil, Argentina and Chile.

Honours

Club
Universidad de Chile
 Primera División de Chile (1): 2004 Apertura

Notes

External links
 

1975 births
Living people
Paraguayan footballers
Paraguayan expatriate footballers
Paraguay international footballers
Sport Club Internacional players
Cruzeiro Esporte Clube players
Cerro Porteño players
12 de Octubre Football Club players
Club Guaraní players
Club Nacional footballers
Club Libertad footballers
Sportivo Luqueño players
Universidad de Chile footballers
Talleres de Córdoba footballers
C.D. Huachipato footballers
Chilean Primera División players
Expatriate footballers in Argentina
Expatriate footballers in Brazil
Expatriate footballers in Chile
Paraguayan expatriate sportspeople in Chile
Paraguayan expatriate sportspeople in Brazil
Paraguayan expatriate sportspeople in Argentina
Sportspeople from Asunción
Association football defenders